Capricornia is the eleventh studio album by Australian band Midnight Oil, released in February 2002 by Columbia Records in Australia and Liquid 8 Records in America.

Album history

Writing and recording 
On the two previous albums Breathe (1996) and Redneck Wonderland (1998), all tracks were credited "Midnight Oil"; on Capricornia the band returns to crediting individual contributors for each track, with Moginie dominating the list as is seen on most of their records.

After the hard rock/electronic sounds of the previous album Redneck Wonderland, on this record Midnight Oil moved to a stripped back sound, with acoustic and clean electric guitars dominating the sound of the album (Golden Age, Luritja Way, Under the Overpass), although some tracks (Too Much Sunshine, Mosquito March, Poets and Slaves) feature significant distorted guitars. These latter tracks also feature distorted vocals. The album also features a short piano solo track (A Crocodile Cries) in the middle of the record, the melody of which is reprised for the album closing Poets and Slaves.

The album was produced, mixed and arranged by Warne Livesey, who also worked on Midnight Oil's seminal Diesel and Dust and Blue Sky Mining records. The bonus track Say Your Prayers, which appears on US versions of the album and was one of the four new tracks on The Real Thing, was produced by the band and Daniel Denholm.

Name and concept 
The name and concept of Capricornia was taken from the novel of the same name written by the Australian author Xavier Herbert. The name Capricornia refers to part of the Queensland coast and inland region around Rockhampton, which is close to the Tropic of Capricorn.

Track listing

Australian version

US version

European version

Charts

Personnel 
 Peter Garrett - lead vocals
 Bones Hillman - bass, vocals
 Rob Hirst - drums, vocals, percussion
 Jim Moginie - guitars, keyboards, vocals
 Martin Rotsey - guitars
 Produced By Warne Livesey, except "Say Your Prayers," produced by Midnight Oil and Daniel Denholm.

References

External links 
 Midnight Oil
 Capricornia Album site

2002 albums
Midnight Oil albums
Bertelsmann Music Group albums
Columbia Records albums
Albums produced by Warne Livesey